Autocharis hedyphaes is a moth of the family Crambidae described by Alfred Jefferis Turner in 1913. It is found in south-eastern Asia, including Malaysia. It is also present in Australia in northern Queensland.

External links
"Autocharis hedyphaes (Turner, 1913)". Australian Caterpillars and their Butterflies and Moths. Retrieved 9 January 2018.

Odontiinae
Moths described in 1913
Moths of Asia
Moths of Australia